Michael Gerard Tubridy (1923 – 16 April 1954) was an all-Ireland winning Gaelic footballer and an international showjumper.

He was born in Kilrush, County Clare, one of ten children of Patrick F. Tubridy (died 1947). He entered the Irish Army as a cadet in November 1941, serving at Ballincollig, County Cork.

He joined the Cork Gaelic Football team and played as a left wing-forward for the Cork senior team in 1945. Tubridy played for the team for just one season in the 1945 championship. It was a successful year as he won a set of All-Ireland and Munster winner's medals. At club level Tubridy played with the Kilrush Shamrocks and Army clubs.

In 1945, he transferred to the Irish Army's Equitation School and achieved many showjumping successes on horses such as Bruree and Ballyneety.

After retiring from the army on 25 January 1954, he was manager of Joe McGrath's Trimblestown Stud Farm in Kildalkey, county Meath.

He died on 16 April 1954 following a riding accident at Trimblestown and was buried in Glasnevin Cemetery on 19 April 1954. He was survived by his widow Dorothy (née Lawlor), known as Dot, and one daughter, Aine.

The Kilrush Shamrocks playing field is officially named "Captain Tubridy Memorial Park" in his honour, although it is affectionately known as "the Cricket Field".  It is located 1 mile south of Kilrush on the road to the Killimer car ferry.

Dorothy Tubridy
Through her husband's equestrian activities, Dorothy ('Dot') Tubridy became friends with Ethel Kennedy, and after his death she remained close to the entire Kennedy family. She became a brand ambassador for Waterford Crystal and Donegal Carpets in the United States, and was instrumental in encouraging the visit of president John F. Kennedy to Ireland in June 1963. Dot also became a writer and a radio and TV commentator, and was a well-known celebrity in 1960s Ireland.

Some sources have described Dot as an aunt of broadcaster Ryan Tubridy while Ryan Tubridy himself, in his biography of John F. Kennedy, referred to Dot as his cousin. In fact there is no apparent immediate family connection between Ryan Tubridy and either Dorothy (née Lawlor) or her late husband Capt. Mick Tubridy.

References

1923 births
1954 deaths
Cork inter-county Gaelic footballers
Munster inter-provincial Gaelic footballers
Winners of one All-Ireland medal (Gaelic football)
Clare Gaelic footballers
People from Kilrush
Irish Army soldiers
Irish show jumping riders